Kaziboletus is a fungal genus in the family Boletaceae. Newly described in 2021, it is monotypic, containing the single species Kaziboletus rufescens, found in Bangladesh. The generic name Kaziboletus honors Kazi M. Badruddoza, a national emeritus scientist and founder of modern agriculture of Bangladesh, while rufescens refers to the context, which changes from white to pale red or reddish orange in patches when exposed.

References

Boletaceae
Fungi of Bangladesh
Monotypic Boletales genera
Taxa described in 2021